The Bliznashki Government was the ninetieth cabinet of Bulgaria which took office on 6 August 2014, following the resignation of the previous government.  This cabinet was a caretaker government of technocrats designated to serve only until a new government could be elected with a popular mandate. The government, led by Prime Minister Georgi Bliznashki, was set up by President Rosen Plevneliev. A new government was formed after the early parliamentary elections on 5 October 2014.

Cabinet

Medarova appointment and pull out

On 8 August 2014 the president Rosen Plevneliev appointed the judge Krasimira Medarova, a former chief of the Central Election Committee, as the minister responsible for conducting the upcoming parliamentary elections. Two days later, on 10 August 2014, Medarova stepped down due to criticism for her former job as a chief of the Central Election Committee. Bliznashki gave up trying to appoint a separate elections minister, and instead announced that he will personally oversee the organisation of the elections.

Miscellaneous

According to some media sources, this is the first post-1989 cabinet without any known former agents affiliated with the Committee for State Security.

External links
Cabinet Composition
Cabinet Composition (Bulgarian)

See also  
 History of Bulgaria since 1989

References

Bulgarian governments
2014 establishments in Bulgaria